B. aurea may refer to:
 Bartonia aurea, an ornamental plant species
 Bellastraea aurea, a sea snail species
 Blakistonia aurea, a spider species in the genus Blakistonia found in South Australia
 Brugmansia aurea, a plant species endemic to Ecuador

Synonyms
 Bambusa aurea, a synonym for Phyllostachys aurea, a bamboo species

See also
 Aurea (disambiguation)